Jessica-Rose Clark (born 28 November 1987) is an Australian mixed martial artist who competes in the women’s Bantamweight division of the Ultimate Fighting Championship (UFC).

Background
Clark was born in Cairns, Australia, as the eldest of nine children. Her ailing single mother took care of the children while living on the road in a van and communities. Jessica-Rose attended regular school for the first time in the fifth grade when the family settled in North Queensland. She attended university after graduating from high school, but dropped out during the first semester. After dropping out, she found kickboxing and gradually started training mixed martial arts.

Mixed martial arts career

Early career
Clark made her professional MMA debut in December 2012 in her native Australia. She fought six times over the next two years for various regional promotions, amassing a record of 5 wins and 1 loss.

Invicta FC
After taking nearly a year off from the sport, Clark made her debut with Invicta FC in July 2015. She faced Pannie Kianzad at Invicta FC 13: Cyborg vs. Van Duin and lost the bout via unanimous decision.

Clark returned to the promotion in November 2016 to face Pam Sorenson at Invicta FC 20: Evinger vs. Kunitskaya. She lost the bout via split decision.

Clark was scheduled to face Vanessa Porto at Invicta FC 26 in December 2017; however, she was removed from the card when she was tabbed by the UFC as a replacement.

Ultimate Fighting Championship 
Clark made her UFC debut against Bec Rawlings in a flyweight bout, replacing Joanne Calderwood at UFC Fight Night: Werdum vs. Tybura on 19 November 2017. At the weigh-ins, Clark weighed in at 128 pounds, 2 pounds over the flyweight upper limit of 126 pounds. The bout proceeded at a catchweight and Clark forfeited 20% of her purse to Rawlings. Clark won the fight via split decision.

Clark faced Paige VanZant on 14 January 2018 at UFC Fight Night: Stephens vs. Choi. She won the fight via unanimous decision.

Clark faced Jessica Eye on 23 June 2018 at UFC Fight Night 132. She lost the fight via unanimous decision.

Clark was expected to face Andrea Lee on 15 December 2018 at UFC on Fox 31. However, Clark was forced out of the bout as she was hospitalized due to weight cutting issues and deemed medically unfit to compete by UFC physicians. As a result, the bout was cancelled.

Clark was scheduled to face Talita Bernardo on 11 May 2019 at UFC 237. However, it was reported on 3 April 2019 that Clark had pulled out of the bout, citing injury.

Clark faced Pannie Kianzad on 9 November 2019 at UFC on ESPN+ 21. She lost the fight via unanimous decision.

Clark faced Sarah Alpar on 19 September 2020 at UFC Fight Night 178 She won the fight via a technical knockout in round three. In the fight she tore her Anterior cruciate ligament, which prevented her from fighting until mid 2021.  

After recovering from the surgery, Clark returned after a year to face Joselyne Edwards at UFC Fight Night 196 on October 23, 2021. Clark won the fight via unanimous decision.

Clark faced Stephanie Egger on February 19, 2022 at UFC Fight Night 201. She lost the fight via an armbar submission in the first round.

Clark faced Julija Stoliarenko on July 2, 2022 at UFC 276. She lost the bout via armbar submission less than one minute into round one, dislocating her elbow.

Clark is scheduled to face Tainara Lisboa on May 13, 2023, at UFC Fight Night 224.

Mixed martial arts record

|-
|Loss
|align=center|11–8 (1)
|Julija Stoliarenko
|Submission (armbar)
|UFC 276
| 
|align=center|1
|align=center|0:42
|Las Vegas, Nevada, United States
|
|-
|Loss
|align=center|11–7 (1)
|Stephanie Egger
|Submission (armbar)
|UFC Fight Night: Walker vs. Hill
|
|align=center|1
|align=center|3:44
|Las Vegas, Nevada, United States
|
|-
|-
|Win
|align=center|11–6 (1)
|Joselyne Edwards
|Decision (unanimous)
|UFC Fight Night: Costa vs. Vettori
|
|align=center|3
|align=center|5:00
|Las Vegas, Nevada, United States
|
|-
|Win
|align=center|10–6 (1)
|Sarah Alpar
|TKO (punch and knee)
|UFC Fight Night: Covington vs. Woodley
|
|align=center|3
|align=center|4:21
|Las Vegas, Nevada, United States
|
|-
|Loss
|align=center|9–6 (1)
|Pannie Kianzad
|Decision (unanimous)
|UFC Fight Night: Magomedsharipov vs. Kattar 
|
|align=center|3
|align=center|5:00
|Moscow, Russia
|
|-
|Loss
|align=center|9–5 (1)
|Jessica Eye
|Decision (unanimous)
|UFC Fight Night: Cowboy vs. Edwards
|
|align=center|3
|align=center|5:00
|Kallang, Singapore
|
|-
|Win
|align=center|9–4 (1)
|Paige VanZant
|Decision (unanimous)
|UFC Fight Night: Stephens vs. Choi
|
|align=center|3
|align=center|5:00
|St. Louis, Missouri, United States
|
|-
|Win
|align=center|8–4 (1)
|Bec Rawlings
|Decision (split)
|UFC Fight Night: Werdum vs. Tybura
|
|align=center|3
|align=center|5:00
|Sydney, Australia
|
|-
|Win
|align=center|7–4 (1)
|Carina Damm
|Decision (split)
|Titan FC 45: Araujo vs. Capitulino
|
|align=center|3
|align=center|5:00
|Pembroke Pines, Florida, United States
|
|-   
|Loss
|align=center|6–4 (1)
|Sarah Kaufman
|Decision (unanimous)
|Battlefield Fighting Championships
|
|align=center|3
|align=center|5:00
|Seoul, South Korea
|
|-
|Loss
|align=center|6–3 (1)
|Pam Sorenson
|Decision (split)
|Invicta FC 20: Evinger vs. Kunitskaya
|
|align=center|3
|align=center|5:00
|Kansas City, Missouri, United States
|
|-
|Win
|align=center|6–2 (1)
|Janay Harding
|Decision (unanimous)
|Eternal MMA 19
|
|align=center|3
|align=center|5:00
|Gold Coast, Australia
|
|-   
|NC
|align=center|5–2 (1)
|Emiko Raika
|NC (overturned)
|TTF Challenge 05
|
|align=center|3
|align=center|5:00
|Tokyo, Japan
|
|-   
|Loss
|align=center|5–2
|Pannie Kianzad
|Decision (unanimous)
|Invicta FC 13: Cyborg vs. Van Duin
|
|align=center|3
|align=center|5:00
|Las Vegas, Nevada, United States
|
|-
|Win
|align=center|5–1
|Rhiannon Thompson
|Decision (unanimous)
|Roshambo MMA 3
|
|align=center|5
|align=center|5:00
|Chandler, Australia
|
|-   
|Win
|align=center|4–1
|Kate Da Silva
|TKO (punches)
|XFC Australia 21
|
|align=center|2
|align=center|4:07
|Brisbane, Australia
|
|-   
|Win
|align=center|3–1
|Zoie Shreiweis
|Submission (rear-naked choke)
|Unarmed Combat Unleashed 2
|
|align=center|1
|align=center|1:33
|Emerald, Australia
|
|-   
|Loss
|align=center|2–1
|Kyra Purcell
|Decision (unanimous)
|Fightworld Cup 16
|
|align=center|3
|align=center|5:00
|Nerang, Australia
|
|-
|Win
|align=center|2–0
|Arlene Blencowe
|Submission (rear-naked choke) 
|Nitro MMA 9
|
|align=center|2
|align=center|3:38
|Logan City, Australia
|
|-
|Win
|align=center|1–0
|Mae-Lin Leow
|TKO (punches)
|Brace for War MMA 18
|
|align=center|3
|align=center|2:17
|Canberra, Australia
|
|}

References

External links
 
 

1983 births
Living people
Sportspeople from Cairns
Sportswomen from Queensland
Sportspeople from Sydney
Sportswomen from New South Wales
Australian female mixed martial artists
Flyweight mixed martial artists
Bantamweight mixed martial artists
Featherweight mixed martial artists
Mixed martial artists utilizing Brazilian jiu-jitsu
Australian practitioners of Brazilian jiu-jitsu
Female Brazilian jiu-jitsu practitioners
Ultimate Fighting Championship female fighters